WSDR (1240 AM) is an American radio station licensed to serve the community of Sterling, Illinois. The station is owned by Fletcher M. Ford and the broadcast license is held by Virden Broadcasting Corp.

WSDR broadcasts a news/talk radio format to the Rock River Valley. WSDR airs Classic rock music during the overnight hours, simulcasting their sister station WZZT 102.7 FM.

The station, established in 1949, was assigned the call sign "WSDR" by the Federal Communications Commission (FCC).

References

External links

SDR
News and talk radio stations in the United States
Radio stations established in 1949
Whiteside County, Illinois
1949 establishments in Illinois